Kenneth Vincent Zinck (born 16 June 1959, Suva, Fiji) is a Fijian politician, who served in the Cabinet from 2001 to 2006 as Minister for Labour, Industrial Relations, and Productivity.

Elections of 1999 and 2001 
An earlier foray into politics was in the general election of 1999, when he contested the Suva City Open constituency as a candidate of the Fiji Labour Party.  He received 29.8 percent of the vote on the first count, some two percentage points behind the United General Party (UGP) candidate Ofa Duncan (now Ofa Swann); when votes for minor candidates had been redistributed under Fiji's transferable voting system, he was more than ten percentage points behind Duncan.  His second attempt, in the 2001 election, was successful.  In the meantime, a coup d'état had deposed the elected government in 2000 and some major political realignments had taken place.  Now a member of the New Labour Unity Party (NLUP), he contested the Suva City General Electors Communal constituency, one of three reserved for ethnic minorities. Zinck won almost 33 percent of the vote on the first count, and went on to defeat Kenneth Mang-Kwong Low of the Soqosoqo Duavata ni Lewenivanua (SDL) with more than 60 percent, after preferences had been distributed.  He was one of only two NLUP candidates to be elected, the other being Duncan, who had defected from the UGP.

The election produced an inconclusive result; Laisenia Qarase's SDL emerged as the largest single party, with 32 of the 71 seats, short of an overall majority in the House of Representatives.  Qarase cobbled together a coalition with a number of smaller parties and independents.  Zinck defied the NLUP leadership by accepting a Cabinet post, and after repeated refusals to resign, he was expelled from the party on 4 December 2003.  He officially remained a NLUP parliamentarian, however, even though the party was deregistered in 2005.

Election of 2006: defeat 
On 20 February 2006, Zinck said he had decided to contest the upcoming election, which was later held on 6–13 May, as an independent candidate.  He had been invited to join the SDL, he told the Fiji Village news service, but had chosen to run as an independent at the request of his own constituents.  Nevertheless, he declared that if elected as an independent, he would continue to support an SDL-led government, and expected to be included in any post-election Cabinet, according to Fiji Live (21 February).  The election was won, however, by Bernadette Rounds Ganilau of the United Peoples Party (UPP), with Zinck finishing in third place.  He blamed ethnic nationalism for his defeat, saying that Fiji's ethnic communities had all voted on communal lines, with the General Electors opting for the UPP.

Political views 
Zinck, who is of Samoan, German, and Fijian descent, has called in the past for increased representation for ethnic minorities in the House of Representatives.  On 10 August 2005, he complained that the 8 seats allocated to minorities (Europeans, Chinese, Banaban Islanders, and others) under the 1970 Constitution had been whittled down to 5 in 1990 and 3 in 1997.  If the trend continued, they might lose their parliamentary representation altogether, he said.  He called for constitutional amendments to raise the number to at least 5.

He also called for minorities to be accorded the same status as Rotuman Islanders, who were entitled to affirmative action as well as special scholarships and Fiji Development Bank loans.

Zinck's calls for greater minority representation in Parliament were immediately criticized by former Cabinet Minister Tomasi Vakatora, who said that the 3 seats allocated to them were already more than their population numbers warranted. When they had been allocated 8 seats in 1970, their contribution to the economy had been much more significant, he said.

On 15 December 2005, Zinck called for Pacific nations to form a bloc to present a united front to represent common interests before international organizations, such as the World Trade Organization.

2006 coup d'état 

Following his electoral defeat, Zinck became a trade unionist.  He was arrested, and later released, by the Republic of Fiji Military Forces on the evening of 6 December 2006, after a relative of Military Commander Commodore Frank Bainimarama, who had seized power the previous day, allegedly heard him making derogatory comments about the Commander at Suva's United Club. (source) Zinck claimed to have been subjected to degrading treatment, including being forced to run around a sports field with the guns of four soldiers trained upon him.  He was then allegedly forced to stand under a spotlight at Queen Elizabeth Barracks with soldiers standing behind him, warning him against making further statements against the Commander, before being ordered to leave the barracks.  Fiji Human Rights Commission Director Shaista Shameem said on 9 December that the incident was being investigated. (source)

On 14 December 2006, the Military authorities terminated Zinck's membership of the board of the Civil Aviation Authority of Fiji.

See also 
 Politics of Fiji

External links 

Members of the House of Representatives (Fiji)
Living people
1959 births
Fijian people of Samoan descent
Fijian people of German descent
Fijian people of I-Taukei Fijian descent
Government ministers of Fiji
Fiji Labour Party politicians
New Labour Unity Party politicians
Fijian trade unionists
Ethnic minority members of the House of Representatives (Fiji)
Fijian Roman Catholics
Politicians from Suva